Paraegista apoiensis is a genus of air-breathing land snails, terrestrial pulmonate gastropod mollusks in the family Bradybaenidae. This species is endemic to Japan.

References

Molluscs of Japan
Paraegista
Gastropods described in 1970
Taxonomy articles created by Polbot